Hisham Abdulrahman Alhowaish is a Saudi actor and TV host. He won the title of the second edition of the Arab version of Star Academy in 2005.

Early life
Abdulrahman was born on 7 March 1980 in Jeddah, Saudi Arabia. He has eight sisters and seven brothers. He is married to the writer Nadin Aldouweghri and has two boys and one girl.

In 2006, he starred in Rotana's comedy-drama film Keif al-Hal?, Saudi Arabia's first big-budget film, produced by Ayman Halawani. Abdulrahman is also the presenter of the Middle East Broadcasting Center's show Cash Taxi, the Arab world version of Cash Cab.

Filmography

References

External links

 HishamStar on Instagram
 

Saudi Arabian male film actors
Star Academy winners
1980 births
Living people
Contestants from Arabic singing competitions
People from Jeddah